Malawi competed at the 1984 Summer Olympics in Los Angeles, California, United States.  The nation returned to the Olympic Games after boycotting both the 1976 and 1980 Games. Fifteen competitors, all men, took part in sixteen events in three sports.

Athletics

Men's 400 metres 
 Agripa Mwausegha
 Heat — 49.12 (→ did not advance)

Men's 5,000 metres 
 George Mambosasa
 Heat — 14:48.08 (→ did not advance)

Men's 10,000 metres
 Matthews Kambale
 Qualifying Heat — 30:47.73 (→ did not advance, 38th place out of 41)

Men's Marathon
 George Mambosasa — 2:46:14 (→ 74th place)
 Matthews Kambale — did not finish (→ no ranking)

Boxing

Cycling

Four cyclists represented Malawi in 1984.

Individual road race
 Dyton Chimwaza — did not finish (→ no ranking)
 Daniel Kaswanga — did not finish (→ no ranking) 
 George Nayeja — did not finish (→ no ranking) 
 Amadu Yusufu — did not finish (→ no ranking)

Team time trial
 Dyton Chimwaza
 Daniel Kaswanga
 George Nayeja
 Amadu Yusufu

References

External links
Official Olympic Reports

Nations at the 1984 Summer Olympics
1984
OLy